The 444th Fighter-Interceptor Squadron is an inactive United States Air Force unit. Its last assignment was with the Washington Air Defense Sector stationed at Charleston Air Force Base, South Carolina, where it was inactivated on 30 September 1968.

History

World War II
The squadron was first activated at Tonopah Army Air Field, Nevada in February 1943, when the 328th Fighter Group expanded from three to four squadrons. The squadron was initially a Bell P-39 Airacobra replacement training unit.  It moved to Concord Army Airfield, California and received Bell P-63 Kingcobra aircraft for training replacement pilots.  Moved again to Santa Rosa Army Air Field, continuing mission until it was disbanded on 1 May 1944 and its personnel and equipment were absorbed by the 434th AAF Base Unit (Fighter Replacement Training Unit – Single Engine).

Air defense

The squadron was reconstituted and activated in 1954 as part of Air Defense Command as an air defense squadron, was equipped with the North American F-86D Sabre and stationed at Charleston Air Force Base, South Carolina with a mission for the air defense of Charleston and the military facilities in the region.  Was upgraded to the North American F-86L Sabre in 1957, an improved version of the F-86D which incorporated the Semi Automatic Ground Environment, or SAGE computer-controlled direction system for intercepts.

The 444th was re-equipped with new McDonnell F-101B Voodoo supersonic interceptor, and the F-101F operational and conversion trainer in 1960. The two-seat trainer version was equipped with dual controls, but carried the same armament as the F-101B and were fully combat-capable.   Operated the Voodoos until September 1968, the aircraft being passed along to the Air National Guard and the squadron inactivated as part of the general drawdown of the ADC active-duty interceptor force.

Lineage
 Constituted as the 444th Fighter Squadron, Single Engine on 19 February 1943
 Activated on 1 March 1943
 Disbanded on 31 March 1944
 Reconstituted, and redesignated 444th Fighter-Interceptor Squadron, on 23 March 1953
 Activated on 16 February 1954
 Inactivated 30 September 1968

Assignments
 328th Fighter Group, 1 March 1943 – 31 March 1944
 35th Air Division, 16 February 1954
 32d Air Division, 15 November 1958
 Washington Air Defense Sector, 1 July 1961 – 30 September 1968

Stations
 Hamilton Field, California, 1 March 1943
 Tonopah Army Air Field, Nevada, 6 June 1943
 Concord Army Air Field, California, 18 September 1943
 Santa Rosa Army Air Field, California, 15 December 1943 – 31 March 1944
 Charleston Air Force Base, South Carolina, 16 February 1954 – 30 September 1968

Aircraft
 Bell P-39 Airacobra, 1943–1944
 Bell P-63 Kingcobra, 1944
 North American F-86D Sabre, 1954–1957
 North American F-86L Sabre, 1957–1960
 McDonnell F-101B Voodoo, 1960–1968

References

 Notes

 Citations

Bibliography

External links

444
Military units and formations established in 1853
Aerospace Defense Command units